Sigma Arietis, Latinized from σ Arietis, is the Bayer designation for a star in the northern constellation of Aries. It has an apparent visual magnitude of +5.52, which is bright enough for the star to be seen with the naked eye from dark suburban skies. On November 20, 1952, it was observed being occulted by the planet Jupiter.

Sigma Arietis is a B-type main sequence star with a stellar classification of B7 V. This is a large star with three times the radius of the Sun and 3.8 times the Sun's mass. It shines around 301 times as brightly as the Sun, with this energy being radiated into space from its outer atmosphere at a scorching hot effective temperature of 13,121 K. It is this heat that gives the star the blue-white hue of a B-type star. Sigma Arietis is spinning at a rapid clip, with a projected rotational velocity of 165 km/s. It is a probable member of the Cas-Tau OB association of stars that share a common motion through space.

In 2016, a stellar companion was reported based on observations using adaptive optics with the Gemini North Telescope.

References

External links
 HR 847
 Image Sigma Arietis

B-type main-sequence stars
Aries (constellation)
Arietis, Sigma
Durchmusterung objects
Arietis, 43
017769
013327
0847